Oswald Capra (born 4 June 1929) is a Swiss former footballer who played as goalkeeper.

Capra joined FC Basel's first team for their 1950–51 season under player-coach Ernst Hufschmid. After playing in two test matches Capra played his domestic league debut for the club in the away game on 10 December 1950 as Basel were defeated 1–3 by Lausanne-Sport.

Between the years 1948 and 1950 Capra played a total of ten games for Basel. Six of these games were in the Nationalliga A and four  were friendly games.

References

Sources
 Die ersten 125 Jahre. Publisher: Josef Zindel im Friedrich Reinhardt Verlag, Basel. 
 Verein "Basler Fussballarchiv" Homepage
(NB: Despite all efforts, the editors of these books and the authors in "Basler Fussballarchiv" have failed to be able to identify all the players, their date and place of birth or date and place of death, who played in the games during the early years of FC Basel)

FC Basel players
Swiss men's footballers
Association football goalkeepers
1929 births
Possibly living people